Koyal Rana (born 4 January 1993) is an Indian model and beauty pageant titleholder who was crowned Femina Miss India 2014. She came to attention at the age of 15 during MTV Teen Diva. At the age of 21 she represented India in Miss World 2014 that was held in London and ended up to be in the top 10 with the highest score. She was crowned Miss World Asia after the event.

Early life and education
Koyal Rana was crowned the winner of Femina Miss India on 5 April 2014. She completed her schooling at St. Thomas' School (New Delhi). She did her undergraduate programme in Bachelor of Business Studies from Deen Dayal Upadhyaya College, University of Delhi.
In 2014, she graduated with distinction as a business student at the University of Delhi, from Deen Dayal Upadhyaya College.

Social work
In 2012, at the age of 19 she Co-founded a Non-Governmental Organisation(NGO),Moksha Foundation. She has been an instrumental part in the promotion of the organization and its activities. Her immense contribution to the cause of sanitation and hygiene led her to win the Miss Beauty with a Purpose Award at the fbb Femina Miss India pageant where she presented the Swastha Bhavishya project to a jury of renowned people. Koyal has also visited a dozen schools to try out various methods of raising awareness about the project by using different content each time with the children to check their responses. She also won Beauty with a Purpose at Miss World 2014 and became third Beauty with a Purpose winner from India in Miss World.

Femina Miss India 2014
Koyal Rana was crowned the 51st Femina Miss India Femina Miss India World 2014, on 5 April 2014, at a ceremony in Mumbai. 
Before entering Miss India, she participated in Femina Miss India Delhi 2014 pageant and was declared the winner and got a direct entry into the Miss India 2014 pageant.

Miss World 2014
After winning the title of Femina Miss India World 2014 represented India at Miss World 2014, the 64th edition of the Miss World pageant.
She made it to the top 10 (scored the highest points).

She bagged highest placement from the Asian continent and the second Continental Queen of Asia from India after Miss World 2008.
Koyal was the best performer in Miss World 2014. She was consistent throughout the competition and made it to almost all the fast tracks.
Here's what she achieved in Miss World 2014:
1. Miss World Asia (Continental Queen of Asia)
2. Beauty with a Purpose (Winner),
3. World Designer Dress (Winner),
4. Beach Fashion - Top 5,
5. Multimedia Award - Top 5,
6. The People's Choice Award - Top 10,
7. Top Model - Top 20,
8. Sports & Fitness - Top 32,
9. Dances of The World - Top 10 Performer.

Work and career
Koyal believes in Yoga and its importance. She keeps conducting various activities to promote Yoga. In 2015 she celebrated the International Yoga festival with narendra Modi's initiative at Rajpath.

Koyal Rana loves staying fit and tries to balance her fondness for yoga with gymming and sports. She gives credit for her good looks to her fitness and diet.

Koyal also promoted Yoga with the help of Reebok from 2014 to 2016. She is the brand ambassador for Reebok since 2014. She was associated with this brand because of the company's ideology and philosophy which matches with hers.

Endorsements
Koyal has been actively attached with numerous endorsements for many brands such as Reebok, Coca-Cola, Tata DoCoMo, Yamaha, Neutrogena, Garnier India and Sony.
Koyal is the Brand Ambassador of Reebok and Neutrogena.
Koyal has featured in many designer clothes and have walked as the showstopper for many Fashion Designers. Some of them are: Falguni and Shane Peacock, Rohit Bal, Shantanu and Nikhil, Joy Mitra, Pankaj and Nidhi, Abhishek Sharma, Ritu Kumar, Sahil Kochar, Neeta Lulla, Marccain, Neha Taneja, Saisha Shinde, Rocky S, etc.
Magazines covers and features: Femina, Competition Success Review, Femina Girl, Hair, Fact Universal, etc.

Miss Teen India 2008
Koyal was crowned Miss Teen India 2008 popularly known as Teen Diva. She represented India at Miss Teen International in Chicago at the age of 15.
She won the Miss Universal Teen 2009 Title. 
Her achievements at Miss Universal Teen: 
1. Miss Beautiful Skin 
2. Miss Photogenic 
3. Miss Viewer's Choice

TEDx Speaker
Koyal was also one of the speakers on the theme 'Zoom Out' for second edition of TEDx IMI New Delhi and TEDx IIM Raipur on the theme 'Infinite Dimensions'

References

External links
Twitter

Living people
Female models from Delhi
Indian beauty pageant winners
Miss World 2014 delegates
Femina Miss India winners
1993 births